Korupun (Korapun) is a Papuan language spoken in Yahukimo Regency, Highland Papua. Dialects are Korupun (Duram), Dagi, Sisibna (Gobugdua), Deibula, (Western) Sela. It is also known as Kimyal of Korupun; Kimyal is another name for Nalca. Indonesian Kemendikbud classified the former as Mek Nalca, while Korupun-Sela is classified as Kimyal.

According to Timothy Usher, the "Korupun" described by Bromley is a separate, though closely related, language.

References

Mek languages
Languages of western New Guinea